The 2008 St. Petersburg Open was a tennis tournament played on indoor hard courts. It was the 14th edition of the St. Petersburg Open, and was part of the International Series of the 2008 ATP Tour. It took place at the Petersburg Sports and Concert Complex in Saint Petersburg, Russia, from October 20 through October 26, 2008.

The singles draw was headlined by ATP No. 4, US Open runner-up, Cincinnati and Madrid Masters, Doha and Marseille winner, St. Petersburg defending champion Andy Murray, Miami Masters, Pörtschach, Warsaw winner Nikolay Davydenko, and Umag titlist Fernando Verdasco. Also competing were Australian Open quarterfinalist Mikhail Youzhny, New Haven winner Marin Čilić, Dmitry Tursunov, Mario Ančić and Marat Safin.

Finals

Singles

 Andy Murray defeated  Andrey Golubev 6–1, 6–1
It was Andy Murray's 5th title of the year, and his 8th overall. It was his 2nd consecutive title at the event.

Doubles

 Travis Parrott /  Filip Polášek defeated  Rohan Bopanna /  Max Mirnyi 3–6, 7–6(7–4), [10–8]

External links
Official website
Singles draw
Doubles draw
Qualifying Singles draw

2008
St. Petersburg Open
St. Petersburg Open
St. Petersburg Open